Asara (also Romanized as Āsārā) is a city in Asara District of Karaj County, in the Alborz province of Iran. It is located in the Alborz (Elburz) mountain range.

At the 2006 census, its population (including the amalgamated villages) was 1,030, in 282 households; Asara village alone had a population of 430, in 125 households. The city of Asara was formed from the former villages of Asara, Rey Zamin, Sira, and Pol-e Khvab. The latest census of 2016 counted 1,339 people in 452 households.

References 

Karaj County

Cities in Alborz Province

Populated places in Karaj County

Settled areas of Elburz